The Minister of Health is a senior member of the Constitutional Government of East Timor heading the Ministry of Health.

Functions
Under the Constitution of East Timor, the Minister has the power and the duty:

Where the Minister is in charge of the subject matter of a government statute, the Minister is also required, together with the Prime Minister, to sign the statute.

Incumbent
The incumbent Minister of Health is Odete Maria Freitas Belo. She is assisted by Bonifácio dos Reis, Vice-Minister of Health.

List of Ministers 
The following individuals have been appointed as Minister of Health:

References

External links

  – official site  

 

Health

Politics of East Timor
Health in East Timor